William Stewart Aimson (born 3 June 1994) is an English professional footballer who plays as a defender for League One club Exeter City.

Club career
Aimson started his career at Eastleigh and at age 17, Aimson joined Hull City after he made an impression on a trial there. On 1 March 2014, Aimson joined Conference Premier side Tamworth on loan. Aimson immediately went straight to the squad and made his debut, in a 2–0 loss against Halifax Town. Aimson went on to make two more appearances for the club.

Aimson joined Tranmere Rovers on loan in November 2014 from Hull City. He made his Football League debut against Southend United at Prenton Park in a 1–2 League Two defeat on 22 November 2014. Aimson broke his tibia and fibula playing against Portsmouth on 29 November after a collision with his teammate Danny Holmes.

In November 2015, Aimson joined League One side Blackpool on a one-month loan deal, though this was later extended to 9 January 2016. In the January transfer window 2016 Aimson was permanently moved to Blackpool for an undisclosed fee. Aimson was released by Blackpool at the end of the 2017–18 season.

On 21 June 2018, he signed a two-year contract with Bury, following in the footsteps of his grandfather Paul, who spent a year with the Shakers during his own playing career. Aimson announced he was leaving Bury on 1 July 2019, calling the reasons for his departure "out of my hands".

On 2 July 2019, he joined up with his former manager at Bury, Ryan Lowe, when he signed for Plymouth Argyle. He scored his first two goals for the club in a 2–2 draw at home to Scunthorpe United.

On 16 June 2021, it was announced he would sign for Bolton Wanderers on a two-year contract. Due to injury, his debut didn't come until 5 October when he started and played 90 minutes in a 4–1 win against Liverpool U21 in the EFL Trophy. Aimson made his league debut for the club on 23 October, replacing George Johnston as a half time substitute in a 2–2 draw at home against Gillingham. He scored his first goal for the club in a 2–1 win against Charlton Athletic on 8 February 2022.

As his contract with Bolton was due to expire at the end of the 2022–23 season, on 27 January 2023 Aimson officially signed for fellow League One side Exeter City for an undisclosed fee, penning a two-and-a-half-year contract with the club.

Personal life
Aimson's late grandfather was Paul Aimson and was pupil at Highcliffe Senior School. Aimson excelled in golf and had a category one handicap (5) but chose football.

Career statistics

Honours

Club
Blackpool
EFL League Two play-offs: 2017

Bury
EFL League Two runner-up: 2018–19

References

External links

1995 births
Living people
English footballers
Association football defenders
Eastleigh F.C. players
Hull City A.F.C. players
Tamworth F.C. players
Tranmere Rovers F.C. players
Blackpool F.C. players
Bury F.C. players
Plymouth Argyle F.C. players
Bolton Wanderers F.C. players
Exeter City F.C. players
National League (English football) players
English Football League players